Darren Barrett is a Canadian jazz musician who won the 1997 Thelonious Monk International Jazz Competition, and is a professor at Berklee College of Music.

Life and career
Canadian Grammy Award winning trumpet player Darren Barrett was born to Jamaican parents.  Darren remembers that, "the first time I heard Miles Davis was on the record ‘Round About Midnight, and when I heard Miles’ sound and approach, I knew that the instrument I wanted to play was the trumpet."

Upon graduating high school, Barrett attended Humber College's Jazz program in Toronto, Ontario and eventually spent a year there and won the Boddington's Music Brass Award for excellence in performance. In 1986, Darren Barrett attended Berklee College of Music on a full scholarship, receiving a BA in Professional Music in 1990. He went on to receive an MA in Jazz Performance in 1993, and an MS in Music Education from Queens College in 1995. It was there that he came under the influence of Dr. Donald Byrd, who became something of a father figure for the young trumpeter. "My quest for a Doctorate degree was interrupted by a special program that was being developed, called the Thelonious Monk Institute of Jazz Performance, at the New England Conservatory of Music." In 1997, Barrett earned a Diploma in Jazz Performance from the Thelonious Monk Institute, where he was a member of the inaugural class and "studied with Barry Harris, Wynton Marsalis, and Clark Terry, getting the opportunity to perform alongside Herbie Hancock and Wayne Shorter". In 1997, Barrett entered and won first place in the Thelonious Monk International Jazz Competition, the biggest jazz competition in the world, which highlights a different instrument each year.

Barrett went on to release his first album as a bandleader, First One Up, in 1999, followed by Deelings in 2001, The Attack of Wren: Wrenaissance Volume 1 in 2004, and A Very Barrett Christmas in 2011. He has most recently released Energy In Motion: The Music Of The Bee Gees (2014) and Live And Direct 2014. Barrett has performed or recorded with Elvin Jones, Jackie McLean, Herbie Hancock, Roy Hargrove Big Band, Common, Will.i.am, Talib Kweli, Esperanza Spalding and Antonio Hart, among others.

Barrett is currently a Professor in the Ensemble department at his alma mater, Berklee College of Music in Boston, Massachusetts. "I'm working on my craft, trying to be as professional and proficient as I can be. I'm just trying to reach people with my music, trying to concentrate on myself as a performer, bandleader and composer. I have many different bands but they all give me the musical platform to pursue anything possible. I want to continue exploring music and the trumpet by being open to the gamut of creativity, incorporating electronics into live shows, and realizing that one must have a great product and a great live show. These are my key principles."

Education

 BA in Professional Music from Berklee College of Music, 1990
 MA in Jazz Performance from Queens College, 1993
 MS in Music Education from Queens College, 1995
 Diploma in Jazz Performance from the Thelonious Monk Institute of Jazz, 1997

Teachers
 Donald Byrd 
 William Vacchiano
 William Fielder
 Bill Adam
 Charles Schlueter 
 Don Johnson

Awards
 Lennie Johnson Scholarship 1987 
 Lennie Johnson Scholarship 1988
 Lennie Johnson Scholarship 1989
 Thelonious Monk International Trumpet Competition 1997 – 1st place

Discography

As leader

 First One Up (J Curve Records, 1999)
 Deelings (J Curve Records, 2001)
 The Attack of Wren: Wrenaissance, Volume 1 (Nagel Heyer Records, 2004) 
 Darren Barrett A Very Barrett Christmas (dB Studios, 2011)
 Darren Barrett & Energy In Motion The Music Of The Bee Gees (dB Studios, 2014)
 Darren Barrett & dB Quintet, Live And Direct 2014 (dB Studios, 2014)
 Darren Barrett & Trumpet Vibes, Trumpet Vibes (dB Studios, 2015)
 Darren Barrett & Trumpet Vibes, The Music Of Amy Winehouse (dB Studios, 2016)
 Darren Barrett & dB-ish, The Opener (dB Studios, 2017)
 Darren Barrett & Time For Romance, But Beautiful (dB Studios, 2018)
 Darren Barrett & The EVI Sessions, Mr. Steiner (dB Studios, 2019)

As sideman
With Elvin Jones
The Truth: Heard Live at the Blue Note (Half Note, 1999)
Roy Hargrove Big Band: Emergence (Emarcy, 2009)
Esperanza Spalding: Radio Music Society (Heads Up International, 2012)
Myron Walden: Momentum: Our Sound (Demi, 2013)

References

External links
 Official website
 Berklee College Faculty Profile

1967 births
Canadian people of Jamaican descent
Black Canadian musicians
Canadian expatriate musicians in the United States
Canadian jazz trumpeters
Male trumpeters
Canadian jazz bandleaders
Musicians from Boston
Musicians from Toronto
Humber College alumni
Queens College, City University of New York alumni
Berklee College of Music alumni
Living people
21st-century trumpeters
21st-century American male musicians
Canadian male jazz musicians